This is a list of notable actresses who have starred in Hindi cinema, the commercial Hindi-language film industry based chiefly in Maharashtra.

The following are some of the most popular Indian actresses of their decades:

1920s

1930s

1940s

1950s

1960s

1970s

1980s

1990s

2000s

2010s

2020s

References

Actresses
 
Actresses
Bollywood